Guy Nattiv (born May 24, 1973) is an Israeli film director, screenwriter and producer who lives and works in the United States. His film Skin won an Oscar for best short film at the 91st Academy Awards. As of May 2021, Nattiv and Moshe Mizrahi are the only Israeli directors who have won an Academy award. In 2019, he received IFF Achievement in Film Award at the 33rd Israel Film Festival.

Early life 
Early in his career Nattiv worked in advertising. He served as head copywriter and then chief creative director for the advertising agency "Publicis Groupe" for 7 years. 
Nattiv graduated in 2012 from "Camera Obscura film school" in Tel-Aviv, Israel. He has been an official member of The Academy of Motion Picture Arts and Sciences since 2019.

Career 
He began his career as a film director and screenwriter in 2002 directing his graduate short film at Camera Obscura film school in Tel-Aviv, The Flood, which won dozens of international film festivals around the world including the Crystal Bear Award at the Berlin International Film Festival for best short film. In 2003, he began collaborating with director Erez Tadmor. Together they directed the short film Strangers, starring Guy Loell and Sami Samir, about a Jew and an Arab who meet on a train and encounter a group of Neo Nazi skinheads. The film won the 2003 Sundance Film Festival Audience Award for Best Short Film, and the Wolgin Award at the Jerusalem Film Festival in 2003. Strangers also won more than 30 international film festivals and was shortlisted short for the Oscars.

Nattiv & Tadmor's second short film, Offside, starring Liron Levo and Ido Musari, won the short film award at the 2006 Manhattan Film Festival. In 2008 Nattiv & Tadmor developed their short film Strangers into a feature of the same name. The film is led by Liron Levo and Lubna Azabal. Strangers has participated in dozens of international film festivals, including the official competition at the 2008 Sundance Film Festivals and the 2008 Tribeca Film Festival. Strangers has been sold and distributed in more than 28 countries around the world. In addition, actress Lubna Azabel won the most Promising Actress Award at the 2008 Jerusalem Film Festival.

In 2010, Nattiv wrote and directed his second feature Mabul aka The Flood which was nominated for 4 Israeli Ophir Awards. The film stars Ronit Alkabetz, Yoav Rotman, Tzachi Grad and Michael Moshonov, who also won the Ophir Award for Best Supporting Actor. Mabul won a Special Mention at the 2011 Berlin film Festival (Generation category), the Audience Award and Special Artistic Achievement in the 2011 Thessaloniki Film Festival and was Nominated at the 2011 Asia Pacific Screen Awards for Best Children's Feature Film.

His third feature film Magic Men (In collaboration with Erez Tadmor) is a journey of a father and son in northern Greece, following a Greek magician who has disappeared. The film stars Kerem Khuri and Zohar Strauss, the script was written in collaboration with Sharon Maimon. Erez and Guy co-directed the film, produced by Shemi Sheinfeld and Amitan Menelson with the investment of the Rabinowitz Foundation and Channel 10. The film received four nominations at the Ophir Israeli Awards, including Best Picture, Supporting Actor and original score and won Best Actor and the Israeli Critics circle. The film hit theaters in March 2014.
In addition, Nattiv directed and wrote (in collaboration with Erez Tadmor) a 12-minute short film called Dear God starring Lior Ashkenazi and Raymond Amsalem, a poetic drama about the Western Wall guard, who follows a mysterious woman who comes to the Western Wall every day and at the end of each day, the guard reads the notes she writes and buries them in the Western Wall. He decides to fulfill her secret wishes. The film was funded by the Film and Television "Makor Fund" and was nominated for an Ophir Israeli Award in the Best Short Film category. Dear God is the last collaboration of Nattiv and Tadmor. Tadmor and Nattiv pointed out that Dear God is actually part of a trilogy where it joins Offside and Strangers as the last of the trilogy of short films without dialogue that they directed together. It shows how "People connect in absurd and extreme situations without words, just humanity".

In 2018, Nattiv made his first American short Skin. He co-wrote the script with Sharon Maimon, based on Maimon's original idea. Skin was co-produced with Nattiv's wife and partner Jaime Ray Newman and stars Daniel McDonald, as well as Lonnie Chavis, Jonathan Tucker, Ashley Thomas and Jackson Robert Scott. Skin won the Academy Award for Best Live Action Short Film at the 91st Academy Awards.  The short is a 20-minute movie, that focuses on a hate crime and its impact on a skinhead and two young children, one black and one white. The film participated in more than 400 film festivals and won 31 awards including Saint-Petersburg International Film Festival, Clermont-Ferrand International Short Film Festival, HollyShorts Film Festival and more.In 2018, Nattiv's feature film Skin was released which he made with his wife Newman. It stars Vera Farmiga, Jamie Bell, Danielle Macdonald, Bill Camp, Louisa Krause, Mike Colter and Mary Stuart Masterson. Israeli producer Oren Moverman along with Trudie Styler, Sting's wife, signed on as producers of the movie. Skin, the feature was released on June 27 through DirecTV, before theaters on July 26 through A24. The film centers on the character Bryon Widner, a tattoo-covered skinhead, who decides to turn his back on the hate with which he was raised, going through a tremendously painful process to have every bit of offensive ink removed from his skin. This character was played by Jamie Bell. The feature-length version premiered at the Toronto Film Festival, where it won the Fipresci Prize,an award given by the International Federation of Film Critics. It was sold to more than 30 countries around the world, and participated at the Deauville Film Festival. The Hollywood Reporter called Bell's performance "moving" and "powerful". Skin, the feature is based on the life of Bryon Widner a neo nazi skinhead who retired from the violent activity and later even became an FBI informant and was one of the prominent spokesmen against the hate groups. Widner was a vigorous and violent neo-Nazi activist, whose skin was full of hateful tattoos.

Nattiv's next film Harmonia, a feature film based on the life of his grandmother, a holocaust survivor, who ended up as part of a women's cult in Virginia produced by Sight Unseen. The film is yet to be released as of June 2021. Nattiv is also attached to direct Golda starring Helen Mirren. Michael Kuhn and Nicholas Martin are the producer of the film. Martin also wrote the screenplay. The plot of Golda focuses on the decisions made by Meir during the Yom Kippur War, when the combined forces of Egypt, Syria and Jordan launched a surprise attack on Israel in 1973.

As in January 2020, Nattiv and Jaime Ray Newman together with Keshet Studios have been known developing A Stuntwoman, a limited series based on the book of the same name by Julie Ann Johnson and Deadlines David Robb.  The series is about Johnson, a pioneer for women stunt performers and one of Hollywood's first whistle-blowers. It tells the story based on the real life incidents about Johnson who in the '70s became one of the first female stunt coordinators in Hollywood. Johnson battled Hollywood's 'glass ceiling'; she took on the stunt community's 'cocaine cowboys' and she fought against one of the most formidable film and television personalities of her time, Aaron Spelling.

In 2021, Nattiv and Newman created Life Unexpected, a short documentary shot over 10 years in intimate, raw home footage that tells the story of the unforgiving roller coaster of bringing life into this world. The short is a co-production between New Native Pictures, Katsina communication and Channel HOT. It premiered at the Lighthouse International film festival in June 2021.  Ouat Media has the world distribution rights for the documentary.

Receptions 
Nattiv said in his Academy Awards speech, "I moved here five years ago from Israel, Layla tov Israel. And my grandparents are Holocaust survivors. And, you know, the bigotry that they experienced in the Holocaust, we see that everywhere today in America, in Europe. And this film is about education. It's about teaching your kids a better way". According to Gal Uchovsky, Nattiv's Oscar win is "a big deal", because it could open doors for other Israeli filmmakers with dreams of making it big in Hollywood. Variety called him "an undeniably gifted filmmaker" and the film Skin a "stunner". Avner Shavit, a veteran film critic for Israeli news site Walla! told The Wrap "he'd never seen anything like it".

Personal life 
In 2012 he married actress and producer Jamie Ray Newman. In 2015 Nattiv moved to Los Angeles, USA. The two have two daughters named Alma Ness and Mila Nico. They started their production company in 2021 named New Native Pictures.

Filmography

See also 
 List of Israeli Academy Award winners and nominees
 Skin (2018 short film)
 Skin (2018 feature film)
 Mabul (film)
 Strangers (2007 Israeli film)

References

External links

 

1973 births
Living people
Film people from Tel Aviv
Israeli film directors
Israeli film producers
Israeli male screenwriters
Directors of Live Action Short Film Academy Award winners